Tavo Nachón is the protagonist in the TV series Skimo. He is portrayed by actor Miguel Santa Rita.

Profile 
Tavo is the total opposite of Fito but also his inseparable best friend. He is a shy, methodical 16-year-old boy overly obsessed with cleanliness and health. He often finds himself in situations because of his obsession for order and control. He often smears his hands in alcohol or gel to eliminate bacteria, or reads the anti-cancer properties of broccoli and other foods. Tavo is very thoughtful, sensitive and cautious so that business would be at its peak. He is highly organized: always doing things on a long list of events. Tavo sometimes treats Ursula as if she was his girlfriend. He enjoys anything near or to do with Ursula (like when he organized her sweet 16, which is almost ruined by the twins). Tavo is intelligent and very nice. He secretly had a crush on Ursula, and asked if she wanted to be his girlfriend in the 1st season but she said no. In the second season the two of them tried to forget about having a romantic relationship, and to just be friends. Tavo sees Ursula on the verge of kissing Fito in the last season since Ursula started to like Fito but no one knew this.

Relations 
Although Tavo and Fito possess such different personalities (or maybe that's why), they are inseparable. Also their friendship is very competitive, which is why we always see them trying to show who is the best at everything. This benefits the business but also puts them in constant problems. Tavo is often intimidated by the constant attacks and insults from the twins Nora and Nori, who he hates more than anyone in the world. Tavo is very obsessive, controlling and paranoid, and falls into problems and even fights with his friends because of his personality. Compared to some people, Tavo has a conservative look and has no piercings and rings on his body; always well managed.

Personal Data 
In the first episode of the third season when he is in Aguascalientes, his friends go look for him but they get lost. Tavo misses his friends so much that he returns to Skimo. 
He falls in love with Cris in the third episode of the third season, however at the beginning of the fourth season he loses his interest in her.
In the first episode of the third season Úrsula and Fito find out his last name, Nachón.
He has a stepbrother named Heicker.
He is the only character whose full name is known.

See also 
Skimo
Fito
Úrsula
Nora and Nori

External links 
Tavo Blog 

Skimo characters